Park Min-Woo (born March 22, 1988) is a South Korean actor. He is 188.5 cm tall. Min-Woo made his official acting debut with his supporting role in the romantic comedy series Cool Guys, Hot Ramen (2011). He has since continued to appear in television dramas, such as I Need a Fairy (2012), Play Guide (2013), and Modern Farmer  (2014).

Park is also one of the cast members on reality/variety show Roommate, which began airing in 2014.

He enlisted in the military September 26, 2016. A source reveals that it was decided he would serve as part of public interest service personnel due to health reasons. After his entrance to the Nonsan training camp on the 29th, the actor trained for four weeks and rendered 23 months of social rather than military service.

Park Min Woo was involved in an accident while riding his motorcycle near the Donghodaegyo Bridge on March  2018.

Park Min Woo underwent major surgery and was in the intensive care unit. His surgery went well, and his condition is improving.

Filmography

Film

Television series

Variety show

Music video

References

External links
  
 Park Min-woo at Cyworld 
 
 

1988 births
Living people
South Korean male television actors
South Korean television personalities
Kookmin University alumni